The 1971 UK & Ireland Greyhound Racing Year was the 45th year of greyhound racing in the United Kingdom and Ireland.

Roll of honour

Summary
The annual National Greyhound Racing Club (NGRC) returns were released, with totalisator turnover at £56,188,971 and attendances recorded at 7,119,398 from 5808 meetings.

Dolores Rocket was Greyhound of the Year after winning the English Greyhound Derby at White City and St Leger at Wembley. Her performances shone through during a difficult year that saw the closure of four tracks. The tracks were Kings Heath Stadium, which had only just recently been purchased by the Greyhound Racing Association (GRA) under their GRA Property Trust, Charlton Stadium (also GRA), the City Stadium, Norwich and Houghton Stadium in Durham.

Tracks
Hendon was the first track to declare decimal dividends and Milton Keynes (known as Bletchley or the Groveway) switched from independent status to full NGRC status.

Competitions
Following the closure of Charlton, three events came to an end. The Olympic would return in 1979 at Brighton and the Greenwich Cup was moved to Catford but the Cloth of Gold was discontinued. The Welsh Greyhound Derby at Cardiff Arms Park and the Grand Prix at Walthamstow were given the overdue status of being an official classic status competition, by the NGRC.

The Eclipse was switched to Hall Green for a two-year period.

Sherrys Prince successfully defended his Grand National, breaking the track record twice, first recording 29.26 seconds in the heats and then 29.20 in the semi-finals. The only other greyhounds that had achieved double Grand National glory were Juvenile Classic (1940) and Blossom of Annagura (1950). Dolores Rocket won the Spring Cup over 700 yards at Wimbledon and set a track record at Crayford before victory in the Wembley Spring Cup.

Don't Gambol won a second successive Scurry Gold Cup at Clapton and in the year ending annual Duke of Edinburgh Cup, Leeds provided a shock by reaching the final and beating Clapton to lift the trophy.

News
A change in the betting laws allowed tracks to hold an extra 26 race meetings per year. Crayford & Bexleyheath Stadium was the latest track to change to a contract trainer system, which led to Henry Parson's 33-year training career coming to an end after he joined the racing office. Slough and Reading followed suit soon after. Another trainer Stan Gray also retired after 35 years at Southend and Frank Melville left Rochester Stadium for Harringay Stadium, Melville was replaced by Jimmy Keane.

The demise of the GRA Kings Heath Stadium kennels in addition to the demolition of the Hall Green kennels, meant that the two remaining Birmingham GRA kennel trainers, Eric O'Connor and Peter Harding, were relocated to Powderhall. The Edinburgh track also brought in contract trainers as well (some from Kings Heath). Hall Green Racing Manager Sid Wood moved to Belle Vue Stadium and Bob Rowe (son of Leicester Racing Manager John Rowe) filled the position at Hall Green.

The experiment by GRA to introduce eight dog races continued with trials at Harringay and races at Belle Vue and White City Stadium (Manchester). The Northern Flat took place as an eight dog competition, the first major event to do so. Trainers were also allowed to seed their greyhounds wide for the first time.

Ireland
In Ireland the Bord na gCon introduced drug testing for the first time. Sole Aim was a rare English winner of the 1971 Irish Greyhound Derby which featured one of strongest entries for years.

The Bord na gCon introduced drugs testing for the first time and experiment with the procedures at Shelbourne Park.

Blissful Pride trained by Leslie Mcnair wins his 18th race from 19 starts following victory in the Anglo-Irish International at White City. The Irish star also won the Irish Oaks.

Principal UK races

Totalisator returns

The totalisator returns declared to the licensing authorities for the year 1971 are listed below.

References 

Greyhound racing in the United Kingdom
Greyhound racing in the Republic of Ireland
UK and Ireland Greyhound Racing Year
UK and Ireland Greyhound Racing Year
UK and Ireland Greyhound Racing Year
UK and Ireland Greyhound Racing Year